Colonel Frederick Courtenay Morgan (24 May 1834 – 8 January 1909) was a Welsh Army officer and Conservative politician.

Biography
Morgan was the son of Charles Morgan, 1st Baron Tredegar, 3rd Bt., by his wife Rosamund Mundy. Morgan was commissioned into the Rifle Brigade in 1853 and fought in the Crimean War. He was promoted lieutenant in 1854 and captain in 1855. In 1860 he left the Regular Army and joined the 2nd Monmouthshire (1st Newport) Rifle Volunteers, becoming lieutenant-colonel commanding the 1st Administrative Battalion of the Monmouthshire Rifle Volunteers later the same year. He resigned his commission in 1873. He later commanded the 2nd Volunteer Battalion of the South Wales Borderers and was promoted colonel.

Morgan was elected Member of Parliament for Monmouthshire in the 1874 general election and held it until the reorganisation under the Redistribution of Seats Act 1885. In the 1885 general election, he was elected MP for South Monmouthshire.  He was re-elected successively four more times in 1886, 1892, 1895, and 1900.  His uncle Charles Octavius Swinnerton Morgan (1803–1888) had represented the old constituency of Monmouthshire from 1840 to 1874.

Morgan lived at Rhiwperra or Ruperra Castle, and died at the age of 74.

Morgan married Charlotte Anne Wilkinson and had two sons and two daughters; both of his sons (and two grandsons) eventually succeeded to the Tredegar barony with the elder son and his own son becoming viscounts (1926 recreation).
Children:

Blanche Frances Morgan (10 February 1859 – 31 December 1948); she married Charles Twysden Hoare on 18 September 1883.
Violet Wilhelmina Morgan (23 September 1860 – 22 December 1943); married Major Basil St. John Mundy, on 28 August 1894
Courtenay Morgan, 1st Viscount Tredegar (10 April 1867 – 3 May 1934); he was re-created a viscount in 1926, but this title died out with his son in 1949. The barony then passed to the younger son.
Frederick George Morgan, 5th Baron Tredegar (22 November 1873 – 21 August 1954); he was father of the 6th and last Baron Tredegar (1908–1962). The title is now extinct.

References

External links
 
 History of the Morgans of Tredegar
 History of Ruperra Castle includes profiles of the 1st Viscount and his brother Col Freddy Morgan.
 

1834 births
1909 deaths
Conservative Party (UK) MPs for Welsh constituencies
UK MPs 1874–1880
UK MPs 1880–1885
UK MPs 1885–1886
UK MPs 1886–1892
UK MPs 1892–1895
UK MPs 1895–1900
UK MPs 1900–1906
Younger sons of barons
Rifle Brigade officers
South Wales Borderers officers
British Army personnel of the Crimean War